Brett Eichenberger is an American film director and producer. He is known for directing the films Light of Mine, By God's Grace and Pretty Broken.

Life and career
Eichenberger was born in Portland, Oregon and studied film at Portland State University. 
His debut feature film, Light of Mine, premiered at the 2011 Ashland Independent Film Festival and was selected for the Breakthrough section of the 2011 AFI FEST. His second feature film, By God's Grace, starring Cameron Deane Stewart, Roark Critchlow and Jillian Clare was released in November 2014.
Pretty Broken, his third feature film starring Jillian Clare, Tyler Christopher and Stacy Edwards had its premiere at the 2018 Newport Beach Film Festival and is distributed by Freestyle Digital Media.

Filmography

As Editor
 
 2001 - The Beautiful One
 2002 - Long Time No See
 2005 - The Leeward Tide
 2011 - Light of Mine
 2018 - Pretty Broken

References

External links
 

Living people
American film directors
American film producers
Artists from Portland, Oregon
Portland State University alumni
Year of birth missing (living people)